Rampuram is a village of the Kanaganapalle mandal in Anantapur District of the Indian state of Andhra Pradesh.

Etymology 

As the village is built around the Temple of Lord Gosaramudu (గోసారాముడు గుడి), the village got the name of Rampuram,

History 

There is no documented proof of when the village is established, but the geographical location of the village explains that around 150–200 years back some shepherds settled on the bank of small river(Pandameru vaagu-which passes raptadu lake and reaches Anantapur cheruvu)  and built the village around the temple of lord Gosaramudu (గోసారాముడు గుడి).

There is also the Temple of Hanuman (ఆ౦జనేయసామి గుడి) on the outskirts of the village as the symbol of protecting the village from evil and demons, but as the time passed the village expanded.

References

Villages in Anantapur district